Koshkabad (also Romanized as Koshkābād; also known as Khushkabad, Koshgābād, Kūshakābād, and Kūshkābād) is a village in Sojas Rud Rural District, Sojas Rud District, Khodabandeh County, Zanjan Province, Iran. At the 2006 census, its population was 620, in 121 families.

References 

Populated places in Khodabandeh County